Doug Root (born December 16, 1977) is an American former professional tennis player.

A native of Mendham, New Jersey, Root played prep tennis at West Morris Mendham High School.

Root competed in collegiate tennis for Duke University, where he twice earned All-American honors for doubles. He was also the ACC Rookie of the Year in 1997 and a four-time All-ACC selection. In 2000 he partnered with Ramsey Smith to make the NCAA doubles semi-finals, the best ever run by a Duke pairing.

Root featured briefly on the professional tour after college and made an ATP Tour main draw appearances in doubles at the 2000 Hall of Fame Championships in Newport. He won five doubles titles at ITF Futures level.

ITF Futures titles

Doubles: (5)

References

External links
 
 

1977 births
Living people
American male tennis players
Duke Blue Devils men's tennis players
Tennis people from New Jersey
People from Mendham Township, New Jersey
West Morris Mendham High School alumni